Aldergrove Community Secondary School is a public high school in Aldergrove, British Columbia, Canada, and is part of School District 35 Langley. It is the second oldest high school in the Langley School District, first opening its doors as Aldergrove High School in 1958.

The school currently has three Youth Train in Trades programs specializing in Automotive Service Technician, Carpentry, and Hairstylist (Cosmetology) run through the Industry Training Authority. Students enrolled in the Youth Train in Trades programs earn dual credits for attending both high school and first-year university level courses.

Notable alumni
Erin Cebula
Frank Giustra
Joel Waterman

References

High schools in British Columbia
School District 35 Langley
Educational institutions established in 1958
1958 establishments in British Columbia